Izvoru Dulce may refer to several villages in Romania:

 Izvoru Dulce, a village in Beceni Commune, Buzău County
 Izvoru Dulce, a village in Merei Commune, Buzău County